The English National Concessionary Travel Scheme is a national scheme by the Department for Transport in conjunction with local authorities across England.

The scheme extended the provision of free bus travel within individual local authorities to allow travel throughout England from 1 April 2008. English residents who have attained the state pension age for women, which is gradually being increased from 60 to 66, as well as eligible disabled people, are provided with free off-peak bus travel on weekdays and all day at weekends and bank holidays. Certain local authorities offer extra benefits for use within their area. Comparable schemes operate within Wales and Scotland.

There are two types of concessionary pass. The Senior pass has a blue panel at the right hand side of the pass. A disabled person's pass has an orange panel.

A Senior pass is valid between 09:30 and 23:00 on weekdays and at any time at weekends and public holidays.  An accessibility pass has the same statutory validity, but some authorities allow disabled persons to travel at additional times. Both types of pass are valid throughout England only, although some cross-border journeys are permitted, providing the journey starts or ends in England. Additionally some authorities allow qualifying holders of an accessibility pass to be accompanied by a companion who is entitled to free travel when and while accompanying the pass holder.  This scheme is not nationwide and consequently the companion can only accompany the disabled person within the administrative area of the pass issuer and the area of any other authority that accepts a companion pass from other areas.  Issuing authorities identify the accessibility pass as a companion pass with a "C+" in the top right corner.

See also
 Freedom Pass
 Scottish National Entitlement Card

References

External links
Channel 4 News, 16 July 2010: Breaking the bus pass promise?

Fare collection systems in the United Kingdom
Bus transport in the United Kingdom
Old age in the United Kingdom